The Just SuperSTOL is an American STOL amateur-built aircraft, designed and produced by Just Aircraft of Walhalla, South Carolina. The aircraft is supplied as a kit for amateur construction.

Design and development
The Superstol is a development of the Just Highlander and differs by the addition of automatic leading edge slats, a long stroke air shock  robust landing gear with  tundra tires, Fowler flaps and a newly designed tailplane. The resulting design features a strut-braced high-wing, a two-seats-in-side-by-side configuration enclosed cockpit accessed by doors, fixed conventional landing gear and a single engine in tractor configuration. It is designed for operation on rough airfields.

The aircraft fuselage is made from welded 4130 steel tubing, while the wing uses an aluminum spar and aluminum ribs, all covered in doped aircraft fabric. The wings are supported by "V" struts with jury struts and can be folded for ground transportation or storage without the need for disconnecting fuel lines or control connections. Standard engines available include the  Rotax 912UL, the  Rotax 912ULS or Rotax 912iS, the  Rotax 914,  Jabiru 2200, the  Jabiru 3300 and the  Volkswagen air-cooled engine, four-stroke powerplants. The aircraft can take-off and land in under

Variants
SuperSTOL
Powered by a Rotax 912 or Rotax 914
SuperSTOL XL
Just Aircraft introduced the Stretch XL, a stretched version in 2015. It can accommodate engines such as the 180 hp UL Power 520 at 255 pounds and the 160 hp Lycoming O-320 at 315 pounds.

Specifications (SuperSTOL)

References

External links

AVweb media interview about the Superstol
Gallery of 23 photos

Homebuilt aircraft
STOL aircraft
Just Aircraft aircraft
Single-engined tractor aircraft
High-wing aircraft